ForeverSpin (stylized as foreverspin) is a Canadian vendor of metal spinning tops, which have a similar appearance to the top seen in the 2010 film Inception. The company funded the initial manufacture of its tops through crowdfunding campaigns.

History

Founding and early years 
In 2013, Viktor Grabovskyy, Ruben Gonzalez, and Cristobal Uribe planned to start an analytics company, but as they didn't have the funding to do so, they decided instead to market a top as a modern piece of nostalgia. They co-founded ForeverSpin together in February 2014.

References 

Canadian brands
Companies based in Toronto
Tops
Toy companies of Canada
Canadian companies established in 2014